Hyles churkini is a moth of the family Sphingidae which is endemic to Mongolia.

References

churkini
Moths described in 2006
Endemic fauna of Mongolia
Moths of Asia